Borjelu or Borjlu may refer to:
 Borjelu, Meshgin Shahr
 Borjelu, Nir
 Borjlu, Nir